Sachem Head Capital Management is a value-oriented investment management firm based in New York City, managed by Scott Ferguson.

The fund was founded in 2012. According to Fortune, Ferguson "tends to be less combative than other activists."

Founding
Ferguson, a protégé of Bill Ackman at Pershing Square Capital Management, founded Sachem Head in 2012. The name derives from Sachem Head, an overlook in the Pocumtuck Range in New England.

Executives
Ferguson is Managing Partner and Portfolio Manager. Michael David Adamski is General Counsel, and Geoffrey Hamilton and Scott Arnold are analysts.

Ernesto Cruz, formerly of JAT Capital and Highline Capital Management, joined Sachem Head in 2013, becoming a partner and an analyst of technology stocks. In February 2017, he left Sachem Head to become a portfolio manager for GIC Private Ltd., Singapore's sovereign wealth fund.

Investment activities
As of January 2014, Sachem Head had around $4 billion in assets under management.

Sachem has taken positions in Zoetis Inc., an animal health-care group. A month after CDK Global, an IT provider, went public in early October 2014, Sachem Head became its biggest investor. As of 2016, CDK's stock had risen by more than 80%.

As of February 2017, Sachem Head's largest position was in Autodesk, which manufactures 3-D design software, and which returned 7.7% in 2016.

In January 2018, Sachem Head asked Whitbread, owner of the Premier Inn chain in the United Kingdom, "to consider a break up of its Costa Coffee chain from its hotels and restaurant businesses." Sachem Head believed that such an action would "boost the value of its individual businesses."

Profitability 
A 2016 article in Fortune noted that while other protégés of Bill Ackman were "struggling," Ferguson was "doing well," outperforming not only Ackman but the market. In 2014, Sachem Head's fund returned 20.5%.

References

Financial services companies established in 2012
Hedge fund firms in New York City
Investment companies of the United States